The fourth season of the American television series Legends of Tomorrow, which is based on characters from DC Comics, premiered on The CW on October 22, 2018, and concluded on May 20, 2019, with a total of 16 episodes. The season follows the Legends, a dysfunctional team of time-traveling superheroes and anti-heroes, and their mission to recapture the magical fugitives that they accidentally released throughout time. It is set in the Arrowverse, sharing continuity with the other television series of the universe, and is a spin-off of Arrow and The Flash. The season was produced by Berlanti Productions, Warner Bros. Television, and DC Entertainment, with Phil Klemmer and Keto Shimizu serving as showrunners.

The season was ordered in April 2018, and production began that July. Principal cast members Brandon Routh, Caity Lotz, Maisie Richardson-Sellers, Tala Ashe, Amy Louise Pemberton, Nick Zano, and Dominic Purcell return from previous seasons, while Jes Macallan, Matt Ryan and Courtney Ford were promoted to the principal cast from their recurring statuses in season three. They are joined by new cast member Ramona Young. The series was renewed for a fifth season on January 31, 2019.

Episodes

Cast and characters

Main 
 Brandon Routh as Ray Palmer / Atom and Neron
 Caity Lotz as Sara Lance / White Canary
 Maisie Richardson-Sellers as Charlie
 Tala Ashe as Zari Tomaz
 Jes Macallan as Ava Sharpe
 Courtney Ford as Nora Darhk
 Amy Louise Pemberton as Gideon
 Ramona Young as Mona Wu
 Nick Zano as Nate Heywood / Steel
 Dominic Purcell as Mick Rory / Heat Wave
 Matt Ryan as John Constantine

Recurring 
 Adam Tsekhman as Gary Green 
 Tom Wilson as Hank Heywood 
 Susan Hogan as Dorothy Heywood 
 Jane Carr as Fairy Godmother / Tabitha 
 Christian Keyes as Desmond and Neron 
 Darien Martin as Konane 
 Paul Reubens as Mike the Spike 
 Sisa Grey as Wolfie

Guest

Production

Development
At the Television Critics Association winter press tour in January 2018, The CW president Mark Pedowitz said he was "optimistic" and "confident" about Arrow and the other Arrowverse shows returning next season, but added that it was too soon to announce anything just yet. On April 2, The CW renewed the series for its fourth season. Marc Guggenheim stepped down as co-showrunner at the end of the third season, with co-showrunner Phil Klemmer originally set to emerge as sole showrunner for the fourth season. However, Keto Shimizu ultimately replaced Guggenheim as co-showrunner, to serve alongside Klemmer for this season. Guggenheim, the series' co-developer along with Klemmer, remained involved as an executive consultant.

Writing 
Phil Klemmer said that Mallus, the Big Bad of the third season, was "a sort of bellwether of bad guys to come in Season 4", which he said would go deep into the "world of fantastic myths and monsters", without abandoning the time travel nature of the series. He also said the season would further explore the Time Bureau, which was introduced in season three. Klemmer added that at least one of the Legends would "break bad" in the season. Tala Ashe, who joined the series as Zari Tomaz during the third season, said the fourth season would further explore the character's backstory, in addition to the prejudice and xenophobia experienced by her. Courtney Ford, who recurred in the third season as Damien Darhk's daughter Nora, hoped the fourth season would explore what the character is without the influence of her father and Mallus. Klemmer compared Neron, the season's Big Bad, to technology entrepreneur Elon Musk, calling him a "disruptor" in Hell, similar to how Musk affected transportation with Tesla electric cars. Originally, the character of Hank Heywood was designed as the Big Bad of the season, however, when the writers saw Tom Wilson's performance and got to know him as a person, the character was rewritten as more sympathetic and likable. The original plan of turning Nate Heywood into a more sinister character because of his father was also abandoned in favor of a plotline where Hank is turned instead.

Casting 
Main cast members Brandon Routh, Caity Lotz, Amy Louise Pemberton, Dominic Purcell, Nick Zano, and Tala Ashe return from previous seasons as Ray Palmer / Atom, Sara Lance / White Canary, Gideon, Mick Rory / Heat Wave, Nate Heywood / Steel, and Zari Tomaz, respectively. Maisie Richardson-Sellers, who played Amaya Jiwe / Vixen in seasons two and three, also returned as a series regular, portraying a new character named Charlie, one of the season's magical fugitives. While Sellers spoke with an American accent when playing Amaya, she speaks with her native British accent when playing Charlie. In July 2018, Ramona Young was added to the main cast as Alaska Yu, though her character was ultimately named Mona Wu. Matt Ryan, Jes Macallan and Courtney Ford, who recurred in the third season as John Constantine, Ava Sharpe and Nora Darhk respectively, were promoted to regular status for the fourth season.

Keiynan Lonsdale, who portrayed Wally West / Kid Flash as a regular in the latter half of the third season, did not return in the same capacity for the fourth season. He cited his reason being his desire to seek other acting opportunities. This is the first season not to feature Arthur Darvill, who starred as Rip Hunter in the first two seasons, and recurred in the third season. It is also the first not to feature Victor Garber and Franz Drameh, who starred as Martin Stein and Jefferson Jackson respectively, in the previous seasons. This was the last season where Tala Ashe portrayed Zari Tomaz as a main character. She would return in a recurring capacity in future seasons while a new version of Zari from an altered timeline was introduced in the fifth season.

Filming 
Production for the season began on July 5, 2018, in Vancouver, and concluded on January 25, 2019.

Music
On April 16, 2019, WaterTower Music released "I Surrender", a single from the episode "Séance and Sensibility" for free. The single was performed by actors Tala Ashe, Sachin Bhatt, Ramona Young, Brandon Routh, Courtney Ford, Caity Lotz, and Maisie Richardson-Sellers.

Marketing 
The main cast of the season as well as Phil Klemmer attended San Diego Comic-Con on July 21, 2018, to promote the season. On October 15, 2018, Routh released a mock political ad on his Twitter page, voiced by Zano. The ad jokingly claimed that Arrow, The Flash, and Supergirl were trying to keep attention away from Legends of Tomorrow, followed by many headlines as well as real and fake quotes praising the series.

Release

Broadcast 
On June 20, 2018, The CW released its fall schedule, revealing that the series would move from the 8:00 pm Monday time-slot to the 9:00 pm time-slot, to serve as the lead-out to Arrow. The season began airing in the United States on The CW on October 22, 2018.

Home media 
The season was made available for streaming on Netflix in late May 2019.

Reception

Ratings

Critical response 

The review aggregation website Rotten Tomatoes reports a 95% approval rating for the fourth season, with an average rating of 7.99/10 based on 94 reviews.

Accolades 

|-
| scope="row" rowspan="2" | 2019
| rowspan="2" |Teen Choice Awards
| Choice TV Show: Action
| Legends of Tomorrow
| 
| 
|-
| Choice TV Actor: Action
| Brandon Routh
| 
| 
|}

Notes

References 

General references

External links 
 
 

2018 American television seasons
2019 American television seasons
Legends of Tomorrow seasons